Aquiminzaque (Chibcha: Aquim ó Quiminza, died Tunja, 1540) was the last hoa of Hunza, on which the Spanish city of Tunja (in present-day Colombia) was built, reigning from 1537 until his death. His psihipqua counterpart in the southern area of the Muisca was Sagipa. Aquiminzaque was for the Muisca what Túpac Amaru was for the Inca; and as the Inca leader, Quiminza was executed by decapitation.

Biography 
Aquiminzaque was the nephew of his predecessor, Eucaneme. Aquiminzaque‘s reign began on August 2, 1537, when Eucaneme was taken prisoner to Suesca by the Spanish. 

Aquiminzaque ruled over the northern area of the Muisca in present-day Boyacá, Colombia in the years when the Spanish conquistadores were entering the highlands of the Muisca.

At first Aquiminzaque converted to Catholicism, but when he realized the true motives of the Spanish conquerors over the Muisca people, he revolted against them, undermining the initial rule of Hernán Pérez de Quesada, brother of Gonzalo Jiménez de Quesada. Shortly after, in 1540, Hernán executed Aquiminzaque by public decapitation in Tunja. The spectacle, meant as an example, was watched by the Muisca people and executions of other caciques of Toca, Motavita, Samacá, Turmequé and Sutamarchán followed.

The death of the last hoa meant the end of the Muisca Confederation.

Legacy 
In Tunja, the capital of the Boyacá department, a statue honouring Aquiminzaque (Monumento a la Raza Indígena) has been erected.

Aquiminzaque in Muisca history

See also 

Spanish conquest of the Muisca
Muisca rulers, history of Colombia

References

External links 
  Animated video about Aquiminzaque

Muisca rulers
History of Colombia
Murdered royalty
1540 deaths
16th-century South American people
16th century in Colombia
Executed monarchs
16th-century executions by Spain
People executed by Spain by decapitation
Warriors of Central and South America
People from Tunja
Muysccubun